Caloptilia similatella is a moth of the family Gracillariidae. It is known from Colombia and the United States Virgin Islands (Saint Croix and Saint Thomas).

References

similatella
Moths of the Caribbean
Moths of South America
Moths described in 1877